Elisabeth Rechlin (24 March 1930 – 26 May 2021) was a German swimmer who won a bronze medal at the 1954 European Aquatics Championships. She competed at the 1952 Summer Olympics in the 100 m, 400 m and 4 × 100 m freestyle events and finished seventh in the relay. She won four national titles in the 100 m and 400 m freestyle in 1951 and 1952. Her husband, Wilfried Bode (1929–2012), was a water polo player who competed in the 1952 and 1956 Olympics. She died on 26 May 2021, at the age of 91.

References

1930 births
2021 deaths
European Aquatics Championships medalists in swimming
German female swimmers
Olympic swimmers of Germany
Sportspeople from Bochum
Swimmers at the 1952 Summer Olympics